Rod Pelton  is a state senator from Cheyenne Wells, Colorado. A Republican, Pelton represents Senate District 35, which includes much of east-central and southeastern Colorado.

Previously, Pelton represented Colorado House of Representatives District 65, which encompassed Morgan, Logan, Yuma, Kit Carson, Phillips, Sedgwick, and Cheyenne counties.

Background
A farmer and rancher, Pelton served for many years on the Cheyenne County Board of County Commissioners, serving as chair of the commission for most of that time.

Elections

2018
Pelton was first elected as a state representative in the 2018 general elections. In that election, he defeated his Democratic Party opponent, winning 76.3% of the vote.

2020
Pelton ran unopposed in the 2020 state house district 65 race, winning all 31,857 votes cast.

2022
In October 2021, Pelton announced his candidacy for a seat in the Colorado Senate. Specifically, he ran to represent the newly reapportioned Senate District 35, which includes parts of former districts 1 and 35 in east central and southeastern Colorado. His candidacy was successful. In the general election, he defeated his Democratic Party opponent, winning 74.30% of the vote.

References

External links
 Campaign website
 State House website

21st-century American politicians
County commissioners in Colorado
Farmers from Colorado
Living people
People from Cheyenne County, Colorado
Ranchers from Colorado
Republican Party Colorado state senators
Republican Party members of the Colorado House of Representatives
Year of birth missing (living people)